Leporinus bahiensis is a species of Leporinus widely found in the Bahia, Brazil in South America.

References

Géry, J., 1977. Characoids of the world. Neptune City ; Reigate : T.F.H. [etc.]; 672 p. : ill. (chiefly col.) ; 23 cm.

Taxa named by Franz Steindachner
Taxa described in 1875
Fish described in 1875
Anostomidae